This item lists those birds of South Asia in the passerine families from Old World warblers to buntings. 

For an introduction to the birds of the region and a key to the status abbreviations, see List of birds of the South Asia.

For the rest of the species lists, see:
 part 1 Megapodes, Galliformes, Gruiformes and near passerines.
 part 2 Remainder of non-passerines
 part 3 Passerines from pittas to cisticolas

Passeriformes

 Family: Sylviidae
 Chestnut-headed tesia r Tesia castaneocoronata 
 Slaty-bellied tesia r Tesia olivea
 Grey-bellied tesia r Tesia cyaniventer
 Asian stubtail Urospena squameiceps
 Pale-footed bush warbler r Cettia pallidipes
 Japanese bush warbler V Cettia diphone
 Brownish-flanked bush warbler r Cettia fortipes
 Chestnut-crowned bush warbler r Cettia major
 Aberrant bush warbler r Cettia flavolivacea
 Yellowish-bellied bush warbler r Cettia acanthizoides
 Grey-sided bush warbler r Cettia brunnifrons
 Cetti's warbler W Cettia cetti
 Spotted bush warbler r Bradypterus thoracicus
 Long-billed bush warbler N r Bradypterus major
 Chinese bush warbler V Bradypterus tacsanowskius
 Brown bush warbler r Bradypterus luteoventris
 Russet bush warbler V Bradypterus seebohmi
 Sri Lanka bush warbler N r Bradypterus palliseri
 Lanceolated warbler W Locustella lanceolata
 Grasshopper warbler W Locustella naevia
 Pallas's grasshopper warbler W Locustella certhiola
 Moustached warbler rw Acrocephalus melanopogon
 Sedge warbler V Acrocephalus schoenobaenus 
 Black-browed reed warbler W Acrocephalus bistrigiceps
 Paddyfield warbler W Acrocephalus agricola
 Blunt-winged warbler r Acrocephalus concinens
 Blyth's reed warbler W Acrocephalus dumetorum
 Great reed warbler W Acrocephalus arundinaceus
 Oriental reed warbler W Acrocephalus orientalis
 Large-billed reed-warbler R? Acrocephalus orinus
 Clamorous reed warbler R Acrocephalus stentoreus
 Thick-billed warbler W Acrocephalus aedon
 Booted warbler rw Hippolais caligata
 Sykes's warbler Hippolais rama
 Upcher's warbler r Hippolais languida
 Mountain tailorbird r Orthotomus cuculatus
 Common tailorbird R Orthotomus sutorius
 Dark-necked tailorbird r Orthotomus atrogularis
 White-browed tit warbler r Leptopoecile sophiae
 Chiffchaff sW Phylloscopus collybita
 Mountain chiffchaff Rw Phylloscopus sindianus
 Plain leaf warbler W Phylloscopus neglectus
 Dusky warbler W Phylloscopus fuscatus
 Smoky warbler sw Phylloscopus fuligiventer
 Tickell's leaf warbler sW Phylloscopus affinis
 Buff-throated warbler V Phylloscopus subaffinis
 Sulphur-bellied warbler sw Phylloscopus griseolus
 Radde's warbler V Phylloscopus schwarzi
 Buff-barred warbler r Phylloscopus pulcher
 Ashy-throated warbler r Phylloscopus maculipennis
 Pallas's warbler rW Phylloscopus chloronotus
 Chinese leaf warbler Phylloscopus sichuanensis
 Brooks's leaf warbler W Phylloscopus subviridis
 Yellow-browed warbler rW Phylloscopus inornatus
 Hume's warbler W Phylloscopus humei
 Arctic warbler V Phylloscopus borealis
 Greenish warbler rW Phylloscopus trochiloides
 Pale-legged leaf warbler V Phylloscopus tenellipes
 Large-billed leaf warbler rw Phylloscopus magnirostris
 Tytler's leaf warbler r Phylloscopus tytleri
 Western crowned warbler r Phylloscopus occipitalis
 Eastern crowned warbler W Phylloscopus coronatus
 Blyth's leaf warbler r Phylloscopus reguloides
 Yellow-vented warbler r Phylloscopus cantator
 Green-crowned warbler R Seicercus burkii
 Grey-hooded warbler R Seicercus xanthoschistos
 White-spectacled warbler r Seicercus affinis
 Grey-cheeked warbler r Seicercus poliogenys
 Chestnut-crowned warbler r Seicercus castaniceps
 Broad-billed warbler r Tickellia hodgsoni
 Rufous-faced warbler r Abroscopus albogularis
 Black-faced warbler r Abroscopus schisticeps
 Yellow-bellied warbler r Abroscopus superciliaris
 Striated grassbird R Megalurus palustris
 Bristled grassbird V r Chaetornis striatus
 Rufous-rumped grassbird N r Graminicola bengalensis
 Broad-tailed grassbird V r Schoenicola platyura
 Garden warbler V Sylvia borin
 Greater whitethroat p Sylvia communis
 Lesser whitethroat W Sylvia curruca blythi
 Hume's lesser whitethroat W Sylvia althaea
 Small whitethroat W Sylvia minula
 Menetries warbler s Sylvia mystacea
 Eastern desert warbler W Sylvia nana
 Barred warbler V Sylvia nisoria
 Eastern Orphean warbler rW Sylvia crassirostris
 Family: Timaliidae
 Abbott's babbler r Malacocincla abbotti
 Buff-breasted babbler r Pellorneum tickelli
 Spot-throated babbler r Pellorneum albiventre
 Marsh babbler V r Pellorneum palustre
 Puff-throated babbler R Pellorneum ruficeps
 Brown-capped babbler r Pellorneum fuscocapillum
 Large scimitar babbler r Pomatorhinus hypoleucos
 Spot-breasted scimitar babbler r Pomatorhinus erythrocnemis
 Rusty-cheeked scimitar babbler r Pomatorhinus erythrogenys
 White-browed scimitar babbler r Pomatorhinus schisticeps
 Indian scimitar babbler r Pomatorhinus horsfieldii
 Streak-breasted scimitar babbler r Pomatorhinus ruficollis
 Red-billed scimitar babbler r Pomatorhinus ochraciceps
 Coral-billed scimitar babbler r Pomatorhinus ferruginosus
 Slender-billed scimitar babbler r Xiphirhynchus superciliaris
 Long-billed wren-babbler r Rimator malacoptilus
 Streaked wren-babbler r Napothera brevicaudata
 Eyebrowed wren-babbler r Napothera epilepidota
 Scaly-breasted wren-babbler r Pnoepyga albiventer
 Nepal wren-babbler r Pnoepyga immaculata
 Pygmy wren-babbler r Pnoepyga pusilla
 Rufous-throated wren-babbler N r Spelaeornis caudatus
 Rusty-throated wren-babbler V r Spelaeornis badeigularis
 Bar-winged wren-babbler r Spelaeornis troglodytoides
 Spotted wren-babbler r Spelaeornis formosus
 Long-tailed wren-babbler r Spelaeornis chocolatinus
 Tawny-breasted wren-babbler V r Spelaeornis longicaudatus
 Wedge-billed wren-babbler r Sphenocichla humei
 Rufous-fronted babbler r Stachyris rufifrons
 Rufous-capped babbler r Stachyris ruficeps
 Black-chinned babbler R Stachyris pyrrhops
 Golden babbler r Stachyris chrysaea
 Grey-throated babbler r Stachyris nigriceps
 Snowy-throated babbler V r Stachyris oglei
 Tawny-bellied babbler R Dumetia hyperythra
 Dark-fronted babbler r Rhopocichla atriceps
 Striped tit babbler R Macronous gularis
 Chestnut-capped babbler R Timalia pileata
 Yellow-eyed babbler R Chrysomma sinense
 Jerdon's babbler V r Chrysomma altirostre
 Spiny babbler r Turdoides nipalensis
 Common babbler R Turdoides caudatus
 Striated babbler R Turdoides earlei
 Slender-billed babbler V r Turdoides longirostris
 Large grey babbler R Turdoides malcolmi
 Rufous babbler r Turdoides subrufus
 Jungle babbler R Turdoides striatus
 Orange-billed babbler N r Turdoides rufescens
 Yellow-billed babbler R Turdoides affinis
 Chinese babax V Babax lanceolatus
 Giant babax r Babax waddelli
 Silver-eared mesia r Leiothrix argentauris
 Red-billed leiothrix r Leiothrix lutea
 Cutia r Cutia nipalensis
 Black-headed shrike babbler r Pteruthius rufiventer
 White-browed shrike babbler r Pteruthius flaviscapis
 Green shrike babbler r Pteruthius xanthochlorus
 Black-eared shrike babbler r Pteruthius melanotis
 Chestnut-fronted shrike babbler r Pteruthius aenobarbus
 White-hooded babbler r Gampsorhynchus rufulus
 Rusty-fronted barwing r Actinodura egertoni
 Hoary-throated barwing r Actinodura nipalensis
 Streak-throated barwing r Actinodura waldeni
 Blue-winged minla r Minla cyanouroptera
 Chestnut-tailed minla r Minla strigula
 Red-tailed minla r Minla ignotincta
 Golden-breasted fulvetta r Alcippe chrysotis
 Yellow-throated fulvetta r Alcippe cinerea
 Rufous-winged fulvetta r Alcippe castaneceps
 White-browed fulvetta r Alcippe vinipectus
 Streak-throated fulvetta r Alcippe cinereiceps
 Ludlow's fulvetta r Alcippe ludlowi
 Rufous-throated fulvetta r Alcippe rufogularis
 Rusty-capped fulvetta r Alcippe dubia
 Brown-cheeked fulvetta R Alcippe poioicephala
 Nepal fulvetta r Alcippe nipalensis
 Rufous-backed sibia r Heterophasia annectans
 Rufous sibia R Heterophasia capistrata
 Grey sibia r Heterophasia gracilis
 Beautiful sibia r Heterophasia pulchella
 Long-tailed sibia r Heterophasia picaoides
 Striated yuhina r Yuhina castaniceps
 White-naped yuhina r Yuhina bakeri
 Whiskered yuhina R Yuhina flavicollis
 Stripe-throated yuhina R Yuhina gularis
 Rufous-vented yuhina r Yuhina occipitalis
 Black-chinned yuhina R Yuhina nigrimenta
 White-bellied yuhina r Yuhina zantholeuca
 Fire-tailed myzornis r Myzornis pyrrhoura
 Bearded parrotbill Panurus biarmicus
 Great parrotbill r Conostoma oemodium
 Brown parrotbill r Paradoxornis unicolor
 Grey-headed parrotbill r Paradoxornis gularis
 Black-breasted parrotbill V r Paradoxornis flavirostris
 Spot-breasted parrotbill r Paradoxornis guttaticollis
 Fulvous parrotbill r Paradoxornis fulvifrons
 Black-throated parrotbill r Paradoxornis nipalensis
 Lesser rufous-headed parrotbill r Paradoxornis atrosuperciliaris
 Greater rufous-headed parrotbill r Paradoxornis ruficeps
 Family: Alaudidae
 Singing bushlark r Mirafra cantillans
 Indian bushlark R Mirafra erythroptera
 Bengal bushlark R Mirafra assamica
 Rufous-winged bushlark R Mirafra affinis
 Black-crowned sparrow lark r Eremopterix nigriceps
 Ashy-crowned sparrow lark R Eremopterix grisea
 Bar-tailed lark r Ammomanes cincturus
 Rufous-tailed lark R Ammomanes phoenicurus
 Desert lark r Ammomanes deserti
 Greater hoopoe lark r Alaemon alaudipes
 Bimaculated lark W Melanocorypha bimaculata
 Tibetan lark r Melanocorypha maxima
 Short-toed lark W Calandrella brachydactyla
 Hume's lark rw Calandrella acutirostris
 Lesser short-toed lark W Calandrella rufescens
 Asian short-toed lark V Calandrella cheleensis
 Sand lark R Calandrella raytal
 Crested lark R Galerida cristata
 Malabar crested lark r Galerida malabarica
 Sykes's lark r Galerida deva
 Eurasian skylark W Alauda arvensis
 Oriental skylark R Alauda gulgula
 Horned lark r Eremophila alpestris
 Family: Nectariniidae
 Thick-billed flowerpecker R Dicaeum agile
 Yellow-vented flowerpecker r Dicaeum chrysorrheum
 Yellow-bellied flowerpecker r Dicaeum melanoxanthum
 Legge's flowerpecker N r Dicaeum vincens
 Orange-bellied flowerpecker r Dicaeum trigonostigma
 Pale-billed flowerpecker R Dicaeum erythrorynchos
 Plain flowerpecker r Dicaeum concolor
 Fire-breasted flowerpecker r Dicaeum ignipectus
 Scarlet-backed flowerpecker r Dicaeum cruentatum
 Ruby-cheeked sunbird r Anthreptes singalensis
 Purple-rumped sunbird R Nectarinia zeylonica
 Crimson-backed sunbird r Nectarinia minima
 Purple-throated sunbird r Nectarinia sperata
 Olive-backed sunbird r Nectarinia jugularis
 Purple sunbird R Nectarinia asiatica
 Loten's sunbird R Nectarinia lotenia
 Gould's sunbird r Aethopyga gouldiae
 Green-tailed sunbird r Aethopyga nipalensis
 Black-throated sunbird r Aethopyga saturata
 Crimson sunbird R Aethopyga siparaja
 Fire-tailed sunbird r Aethopyga ignicauda
 Little spiderhunter r Arachnothera longirostra
 Streaked spiderhunter r Arachnothera magna
 Family: Passeridae
 House sparrow R Passer domesticus
 Spanish sparrow W Passer hispaniolensis
 Sind sparrow r Passer pyrrhonotus
 Russet sparrow R Passer rutilans
 Dead Sea sparrow V Passer moabiticus
 Eurasian tree sparrow R Passer montanus
 Chestnut-shouldered petronia R Petronia xanthocollis
 Rock sparrow W Petronia petronia
 Tibetan snowfinch r Montifringilla adamsi
 White-rumped snowfinch r Pyrgilauda taczanowskii
 Rufous-necked snowfinch W Pyrgilauda ruficollis
 Plain-backed snowfinch W Pyrgilauda blanfordi
 Family: Motacillidae
 Forest wagtail rW Dendronanthus indicus
 White wagtail rW Motacilla alba 
 White-browed wagtail R Motacilla maderaspatensis
 Citrine wagtail rW Motacilla citreola citreola
 Yellow wagtail W Motacilla flava 
 Grey wagtail rW Motacilla cinerea
 Richard's pipit W Anthus richardi
 Paddyfield pipit R Anthus rufulus
 Tawny pipit W Anthus campestris
 Blyth's pipit W Anthus godlewskii
 Long-billed pipit Rw Anthus similis
 Tree pipit rW Anthus trivialis
 Olive-backed pipit RW Anthus hodgsoni
 Meadow pipit V Anthus pratensis
 Red-throated pipit p Anthus cervinus
 Rosy pipit r Anthus roseatus
 Water pipit W Anthus spinoletta
 Buff-bellied pipit W Anthus rubescens
 Upland pipit r Anthus sylvanus
 Nilgiri pipit  Nr Anthus nilghiriensis
 Family: Prunellidae
 Alpine accentor r Prunella collaris
 Altai accentor W Prunella himalayana
 Robin accentor R Prunella rubeculoides
 Rufous-breasted accentor r Prunella strophiata
 Radde's accentor V Prunella ocularis
 Brown accentor r Prunella fulvescens
 Black-throated accentor W Prunella atrogularis
 Maroon-backed accentor r Prunella immaculata
 Family: Ploceidae
 Black-breasted weaver R Ploceus benghalensis
 Streaked weaver R Ploceus manyar
 Baya weaver R Ploceus philippinus
 Finn's weaver V r Ploceus megarhynchus
 Family: Estrildidae
 Red avadavat R Amandava amandava
 Green avadavat V r Amandava formosa
 Indian silverbill R Lonchura malabarica
 White-rumped munia R Lonchura striata
 Black-throated munia r Lonchura kelaarti
 Scaly-breasted munia R Lonchura punctulata
 Black-headed munia R Lonchura malacca
 Java sparrow Ir Lonchura oryzivora
 Family: Fringillidae
 Common chaffinch V Fringilla coelebs
 Brambling V Fringilla montifringilla
 Fire-fronted serin R Serinus pusillus
 Yellow-breasted greenfinch R Carduelis spinoides
 Black-headed greenfinch r Carduelis ambigua
 Eurasian siskin V Carduelis spinus
 Tibetan serin r Carduelis thibetana
 European goldfinch r Carduelis carduelis
 Twite r Carduelis flavirostris
 Eurasian linnet W Carduelis cannabina
 Plain mountain finch r Leucosticte nemoricola
 Black-headed mountain finch r Leucosticte brandti
 Red-browed finch Callacanthis burtoni
 Crimson-winged finch r Rhodopechys sanguinea
 Trumpeter finch W Bucanetes githagineus
 Mongolian finch W Bucanetes mongolicus
 Desert finch V Rhodospiza absoleta
 Blanford's rosefinch r Carpodacus rubescens
 Dark-breasted rosefinch r Carpodacus nipalensis
 Common rosefinch rw Carpodacus erythrinus
 Beautiful rosefinch r Carpodacus pulcherrimus
 Pink-browed rosefinch r Carpodacus rodochrous
 Vinaceous rosefinch r Carpodacus vinaceus
 Dark-rumped rosefinch r Carpodacus edwardsii
 Three-banded rosefinch V Carpodacus trifasciatus
 Spot-winged rosefinch r Carpodacus rodopeplus
 White-browed rosefinch r Carpodacus thura
 Red-mantled rosefinch r Carpodacus rhodochlamys
 Streaked rosefinch r Carpodacus rubicilloides
 Great rosefinch r Carpodacus rubicilla
 Red-fronted rosefinch r Carpodacus puniceus
 Crimson-browed finch r Propyrrhula subhimachala
 Scarlet finch r Haematospiza sipahi
 Red crossbill r Loxia curvirostra
 Brown bullfinch r Pyrrhula nipalensis
 Orange bullfinch r Pyrrhula aurantiaca
 Red-headed bullfinch r Pyrrhula erythrocephala
 Grey-headed bullfinch r Pyrrhula erythaca
 Hawfinch W Coccothraustes coccothraustes
 Japanese grosbeak V Eophona personata
 Black-and-yellow grosbeak r Mycerobas icterioides
 Collared grosbeak r Mycerobas affinis
 Spot-winged grosbeak r Mycerobas melanozanthos
 White-winged grosbeak r Mycerobas carnipes
 Gold-naped finch r Pyrrhoplectes epauletta
 Family: Emberizidae
 Crested bunting R Melophus lathami
 Yellowhammer W Emberiza citrinella
 Pine bunting W Emberiza leucocephalos
 Rock bunting R Emberiza cia
 Godlewski's bunting r Emberiza godlewskii
 Grey-necked bunting W Emberiza buchanani
 Ortolan bunting V Emberiza hortulana
 Chestnut-breasted bunting rw Emberiza stewarti
 Striolated bunting r Emberiza striolata
 Chestnut-eared bunting rw Emberiza fucata
 Little bunting W Emberiza pusilla
 Rustic bunting  Emberiza rustica
 Yellow-breasted bunting W Emberiza aureola
 Chestnut bunting W Emberiza rutila
 Black-headed bunting W Emberiza melanocephala
 Red-headed bunting W Emberiza bruniceps
 Black-faced bunting W Emberiza spodocephala
 Pallas's reed bunting V Emberiza pallasi
 Reed bunting rw Emberiza schoeniclus
 Corn bunting V Miliaria calandra 

South Asia